"Big Mistake" is a song by Australian singer Natalie Imbruglia. It was written by Imbruglia and Mark Goldenberg for Imbruglia's debut album Left of the Middle (1997). The song was released as the album's second single on 2 March 1998. Although less successful than "Torn", "Big Mistake" still proved to be a hit in certain territories, reaching number two in Iceland and the United Kingdom, number five in Spain and number six in Australia. It was not released in the United States or Canada.

Music video 
The music video for "Big Mistake" was directed by Alison Maclean and filmed in Barcelona, Spain. It features Imbruglia walking through the streets of Barcelona while being pursued by a male suitor, and begins with her walking, oblivious to things that are happening around her. Meanwhile, the man follows her down the street with a bouquet of flowers. While in pursuit of Imbruglia, several obstacles prevent him from reaching her. The video concludes with her riding away from her suitor in the back of a stranger's red pickup truck. The video was inspired by the traffic accident scene in Jean-Luc Godard's film Week End.

Track listings 

Australian CD single
 "Big Mistake" – 4:35
 "Torn" (acoustic MTV Unplugged) – 3:06
 "Something Better" – 4:05
 "Tomorrow Morning" – 3:00

UK CD1
 "Big Mistake" – 4:35
 "Something Better" – 4:05
 "Torn" (acoustic MTV Unplugged) – 3:05
 "Big Mistake" (video)

UK CD2
 "Big Mistake" – 4:35
 "I've Been Watching You" – 4:03
 "Tomorrow Morning" – 3:00

UK cassette single
 "Big Mistake" – 4:35
 "Something Better" – 4:05

European CD single
 "Big Mistake" – 4:35
 "Torn" (acoustic MTV Unplugged) – 3:06

Charts

Weekly charts

Year-end charts

Certifications

References 

1997 songs
1998 singles
Bertelsmann Music Group singles
Music videos shot in Spain
Natalie Imbruglia songs
RCA Records singles
Songs written by Natalie Imbruglia
Songs written by Mark Goldenberg